Stożek Wielki (literally "big cone") is a mountain on the border of Poland and the Czech Republic, in the Silesian Beskids mountain range. It reaches a height of 978 meters.

The border can be crossed on the top, which is in easy range of the town of Wisła. It has a characteristic conical shape and on its slopes grow beech and coniferous trees.

The mountain hut was built on the mountain from the initiative of Polskie Towarzystwo Turystyczne "Beskid" (Polish Touristic Society "Beskid"). It was opened on 9 July 1922. The main initiators of the construction were PTT activists Józef Londzin and Jan Galicz.

Stożek Wielki can be accessed by hiking trails from the nearby municipalities from both sides of the border. There is also a ski resort on the mountain, where skiers can reach using the chairlift.

Through a number of hiking routes it is possible to reach other summits such as Kubalonka, Czantoria Wielka, Soszów Wielki and towns, down into Wisła, Wisła-Głębce, Istebna, Jaworzynka and Jablunkov (Jabłonków).

The so-called Main Trail of the Beskids, the major hiking trail in the region, also crosses the top.

See also 
 Cieszyn Silesia
 Zaolzie

Footnotes

References 
 

 

Silesian Beskids
Mountains of Poland
Mountains and hills of the Czech Republic
Czech Republic–Poland border
International mountains of Europe
Mountains under 1000 metres